Robert E. R. Huntley (1929 – December 10, 2015) was an American attorney, businessman, retired law professor, and former president of Washington and Lee University.

He graduated from Washington and Lee in 1950 and its law school in 1957. He obtained a master's degree in law from Harvard University in 1962. He joined the law faculty of Washington and Lee in 1958, and served as its dean from 1967 to 1968. In 1968 he was named president of the university, a post he held for 15 years.

He practiced law with the Richmond, Virginia law firm of Hunton & Williams from 1988 until his retirement in 1995. He also served as chairman, president and chief executive officer of Best Products. He also served on the board of directors of Altria Group.

Recognition
Washington and Lee established the endowed Robert E. R. Huntley Professorship in Law in 1988.

The building housing the Williams School of Commerce, Economics, and Politics at Washington and Lee was named Huntley Hall in 2004 in his honor.

References

1929 births
2015 deaths
Washington and Lee University School of Law alumni
Washington and Lee University alumni
Presidents of Washington and Lee University
People from Winston-Salem, North Carolina
Washington and Lee University School of Law faculty
Harvard Law School alumni
20th-century American businesspeople